Thomas Carpenter may refer to:
Thomas G. Carpenter (1926–2021), American educator
Thomas Carpenter (glassmaker) (1752–1847), American soldier and glassmaker
Thomas Carpenter III (1733–1807), American soldier
Thomas Preston Carpenter (1804–1876), American lawyer and judge
Thomas Carpenter (MP) (died 1565), English MP who represented Chichester

See also
List of people with surname Carpenter